The Wright TT was a bus body built on Bedford VAS and Bedford YMT chassis by Wrightbus. It was introduced in 1982.

References

Vehicles introduced in 1985
TT